Son of the 100 Best Movies You’ve Never Seen is the eighth book by Canadian author and film critic Richard Crouse. Published in September, 2008 by ECW Press, the book is a sequel to the author's best selling 2003 book The 100 Best Movies You’ve Never Seen. The new book's check list of the best overlooked and under appreciated films of the last 100 years caters to fans of offbeat cinema, discriminating renters and collectors, and movie buffs.

Titles in the book range from the obscure, like 1912's The Cameraman’s Revenge, to El Topo’s unusual existential remake of the classic western and little-seen classics like The Killing. Each essay features a detailed description of plot, notable trivia tidbits, critical reviews, and interviews with actors and filmmakers. Featured interviews include Billy Bob Thornton on an inspirational movie about a man with his head in the clouds, Francis Ford Coppola on One from the Heart and Mario Van Peebles on playing his own father in Badasssss! Sidebars feature quirky details, including legal disclaimers and memorable quotes, along with movie picks from a-list actors and directors.

2008 non-fiction books
Film guides
Canadian non-fiction books